The Cloud County Thunderbirds are the sports teams of Cloud County Community College located in Concordia, Kansas, United States. They participate in the National Junior College Athletic Association (NJCAA) and in the Kansas Jayhawk Community College Conference. The Thunderbirds have won NJCAA national championships in women's basketball (2001) and men's soccer (2011). The school's track teams have finished in the top five nationally on several occasions.

Sports

Men's sports
Baseball
Basketball
Cross country
Soccer
Track & field

Women's sports
Basketball
Cross country
Soccer
Softball
Track and field
Volleyball

Notable alumni 

  Joel Fahie, former British Virgin Islands national team player
 Mike Kirkland, Athletic Director of the Southwestern College Moundbuilders
 Deon Lyle, professional basketball player in Armenia
  Jason Rees, professional baseball player in the Israel Baseball League
 Shanele Stires, former WNBA basketball player Minnesota Lynx and college basketball coach
 Kadell Thomas, soccer player for Forge FC in the Canadian Premier League

References

External links
 

 
Sports teams in Kansas